Nili Natkho (February 18, 1982 – November 5, 2004) was a Circassian-Israeli basketball player who played for Maccabi Raanana and Elitzur Ramla. Natkho died in a car accident at the age of 22.

Her cousin is the prominent Circassian-Israeli footballer Bibras Natkho.

Biography
Natkho was born the Circassian village of Kfar Kama in northern Israel, to a Circassian-Muslim family.

During her childhood Natkho played in a junior Futsal team in the village of Kfar Tavor where she was identified as having great potential. As a result, she was referred to a training camp at the Wingate Institute. Natkho's family, who acknowledged her great potential, took a decision to support their daughter as much as they can. As a result, when Natkho reached 14, her family moved with her to Even Yehuda so that she would be able to practice and play in the Even Yehuda women's high school basketball team. In her first season in the team, Natkho led the team to its first title in the history of the team - the State Cup. Following her success in the Even Yehuda team, in the following year, she joined the team of the Ostrovsky High School in Ra'anana, where she studied and played for three years. During her last season in high school, in 2000, her team won the national high school basketball championship.

During that season Natkho began playing in the Premier League team Maccabi Raanana. Her breakthrough season came a year later, in which she was selected as the discovery of the season.  During her first two seasons in Maccabi Raanana, the team won the State Cup. During her third season in Maccabi Raanana (the 2001/02 season) Natkho scored an average of 13.7 points per game, making her Israel's best Shooting guard of that season.

In 2003, after four seasons in Maccabi Raanana Natkho was transferred, along with her coach Tal Nathan, to the Elitzur Ramla basketball team. During her first season with the team, the team won the national cup.

In 2002 Natkho was invited for the first time to the adult basketball teams, and later on she took part in the European Women Basketball Championship held in Greece during 2003.

Two months prior to Natkho's death, after many years of living outside of the village of Kfar Kama, the family returned to reside in the village.

Natkho only got to play in two games during her second season with the Elitzur Ramla basketball team before she died.

Death 
In the evening of November 5, 2004 Natkho was driving her Ford Focus vehicle along with four other people. While driving on Highway 767, in near proximity to her parents' house in the village of Kfar Kama, for an unknown reason her vehicle lost control, swerved into the opposite lane and collided with a Jeep.

Both Nili Natkho (aged 22) and her sister Diana (aged 19) were killed instantly, while their cousin Raja Tlash (aged 24) died short after of her injury while being operated in the hospital. The two additional passengers in the car, whom were relatives of Natkho, were severely injured in the accident.

References

External links
 "The best shooting guard in the country" was killed in a car accident - published on ynet on November 6, 2004 (Hebrew)
 Six years without Nili Natkho: "She is in our hearts" - published on ynet on November 6, 2010 (Hebrew)
 Bibras Natkho talks about the late Nili Natkho (Hebrew)

1982 births
2004 deaths
Israeli people of Circassian descent
Israeli Muslims
Israeli women's basketball players
Sportspeople from Kfar Kama
Road incident deaths in Israel
Wingate Institute alumni
Shooting guards